A. M. Munirathinam Mudaliyar is an Indian politician Member of the Legislative Assembly of Tamil Nadu. He was elected to the Tamil Nadu legislative assembly from Sholinghur constituency as an Indian National Congress (INC) candidate in the 1989 and 2016 and 1991 elections and as a Tamil Maanila Congress (TMC) candidate in 1996.

Munirathinam and his three brothers, including Ponnuranga, formed a staunch INC-supporting family that has dominated the political life of the mostly rural area of Sholinghur since the 1960s, with one or other of the brothers either winning or being runner-up in eight of the twelve state assembly elections between 1962 and 2011. They operate a private bus company that provides both local employment and much-needed cheap transport, and political scientist Adam Ziegfeld believes their "main source of influence seems to be their status as local notables - wealthy, powerful members of the community who are sources of employment and philanthropy".

Despite his strong allegiance to the INC, Munirathinam was among the many people in Tamil Nadu who deserted the party in favour of the newly formed TMC in 1996. He won in the 1996 elections but could not defend the seat in those of 2001 because an electoral pact between the TMC and All India Anna Dravida Munnetra Kazhagam (AIADMK) entailed that it would be contested by a candidate from the AIADMK and not by the TMC. He was president of the town panchayat when the TMC merged back into the INC after the death of its founder, G. K. Moopanar, and he then became district president of the INC. Despite his position, he was overlooked as a candidate in the 2006 elections, with the party instead nominating D. Arul Anbarasu, the son of Era. Anbarasu, a prominent INC politician at state level. He and his brothers stayed with the INC, who won the seat, but when Munirathinam was again overlooked by the party in favour of Anbarasu at the time of the 2011 elections, he opted to stand as an independent. He came second with 34 per cent of the vote, while Anbarasu was well behind in third place.

In 2021 Tamil Nadu State elections, Munirathinam won the election for 4th time with 26,698 votes defeating AM Krishnan of PMK party.

Electoral performance

References 

Tamil Nadu MLAs 1996–2001
Year of birth missing (living people)
Living people
Indian National Congress politicians from Tamil Nadu
Tamil Maanila Congress politicians
Independent politicians in India
Tamil Nadu MLAs 1991–1996
Tamil Nadu MLAs 2021–2026